Reed, also known as Potomac Yard, is a bus rapid transit station in Alexandria, Virginia, located on Potomac Avenue and Reed Avenue. It is a stop on the portion of the mixed-traffic segment of the Metroway bus rapid transit line, providing two-way service along the route. The station provides service to the central Potomac Yard and Potomac communities in Alexandria.

Reed serves as the alternate southern terminal for some Metroway buses.

History 

Reed opened to the public as one of the original Metroway stations; the station opened for service on August 24, 2014.

References

External links
 Official Metroway site

Buildings and structures in Alexandria, Virginia
Metroway
2014 establishments in Virginia
Transport infrastructure completed in 2014
Bus stations in Virginia